Androcalva pulchella  is a shrub in the family Malvaceae.<ref name=florabase>{{FloraBase|name=Androcalva pulchella|id=40908}}</ref> It is native to Western Australia.

The species was first described in 1846 as Commersonia pulchella by Nikolai Turczaninow, but was assigned to the new genus, Androcalva'' by Carolyn Wilkins and Barbara Ann Whitlock in 2011.

References

pulchella

Flora of Western Australia
Plants described in 1846
Taxa named by Nikolai Turczaninow